Lena Mukhina also Lena Muchina (Yelena Vladimirovna Mukhina; 21 November 1924 in Ufa – 5 August 1991 in Moscow) was a Russian woman who wrote about her experiences as a teenage schoolgirl during the Siege of Leningrad in her diary, pouring out her hopes and fears.

Mukhina's diary entries are dated from 21 May 1941 to 25 May 1942. She was evacuated from Leningrad in June 1942, and lived in Moscow until her death in 1991.

An unknown donor handed the diary to a state archive in 1962; it was discovered there by Sergei Yarov. It has been published in Russia (Сохрани мою печальную историю), Norway (Lena's Dagbok), Spain (El diario de Lena), Germany (Lenas Tagebuch), Poland (Dziennik czasu blokady). and Finland (Piirityspäiväkirja)

See also
Tanya Savicheva
Anne Frank

References

20th-century women writers
20th-century Russian writers
20th-century Russian diarists
Historians of fascism
Women diarists
Women in World War II
1924 births
1991 deaths
Russian women writers
20th-century diarists